Mwanza Lomba is a village in Kasai-Oriental, the Democratic Republic of the Congo. 

In February 2017, in the midst of the Kasaï-Central clashes, a video showing members of the Congolese military killing civilians in the village was leaked online. Both France and the United States called for an investigation into the alleged massacre.

References

Populated places in Kasaï-Oriental